Pirjo Hannele Aalto (born 19 February 1961) is a Finnish biathlete. She competed in women's sprint event at the 1994 Winter Olympics.

References

External links
 

1961 births
Living people
Biathletes at the 1994 Winter Olympics
Finnish female biathletes
Olympic biathletes of Finland
Sportspeople from Huittinen